Emilio Mitre is a station on Line E of the Buenos Aires Underground. The station was opened on 7 October 1985 as a one station extension from José María Moreno. On 31 October 1985, the line was extended to Medalla Milagrosa.

References

External links

Buenos Aires Underground stations